Tuxedo is a genus of plant bugs in the family Miridae. There are about seven described species in Tuxedo.

Species
These seven species belong to the genus Tuxedo:
 Tuxedo bicinctus (Van Duzee, 1914) i c g
 Tuxedo cruralis (Van Duzee, 1917) i c g
 Tuxedo drakei Schuh, 2004 i c g
 Tuxedo elongatus Schuh, 2004 i c g
 Tuxedo flavicollis (Knight, 1929) i c g b
 Tuxedo nicholi (Knight, 1929) i c g
 Tuxedo susansolomonae Schuh, 2004 i c g
Data sources: i = ITIS, c = Catalogue of Life, g = GBIF, b = Bugguide.net

References

Further reading

 
 
 
 
 

Phylinae
Articles created by Qbugbot